Yesterday or yesterdays may refer to:

Yesterday (time), the day before the present day

Film and TV

Film
Yesterday (1959 film), a Hungarian film
Yesterday (1968 film), a documentary written and directed by Raúl daSilva
Yesterday (1981 film), a romantic drama starring Vincent Van Patten
Yesterday (1985 film), a Polish film
Yesterday (1988 film), a Bulgarian drama film directed by Ivan Andonov
Yesterday (2002 film), a South Korean science fiction drama directed by Yun-su Jeong
Yesterday (2004 film), a Zulu-language South African drama directed by Darrell Roodt
Yesterday (2019 film), a romantic comedy directed by Danny Boyle
Quitting, a 2001 Chinese film ("Yesterday" is the literal English translation of the film's Mandarin title)

Television and radio
Yesterday (radio program), a musical radio program in the Philippines
Yesterday (TV channel), a British television channel, formerly known as UKTV History
"Yesterday" (Grey's Anatomy), a 2006 episode of Grey's Anatomy
"Yesterday" (Law & Order: Criminal Intent), a 2002 episode of Law & Order: Criminal Intent

Music
Yesterdays (band), a Hungarian prog-rock band

Albums
Yesterdays (Gato Barbieri album)
Yesterdays (Keith Jarrett album)
Yesterdays (Pennywise album)
Yesterdays (Yes album)
Yesterdays, by Shirley Bassey

Yesterday (Beatles EP), by The Beatles
Yesterday (Grave Digger EP)
Yesterday (Xia EP), by Kim Junsu (XIA)

Songs
 "Yesterday" (Beatles song), a 1965 Beatles single
 "Yesterday" (The Black Eyed Peas song), 2015
 "Yesterday" (Toni Braxton song), a 2010 song from the album Pulse
 "Yesterday" (Ashley Roberts song), a 2012 song
 "Yesterday" (Shanice song), a 1999 song from the album Shanice
 "Yesterdays" (1933 song), from the musical Roberta by Jerome Kern and Otto Harbach
 "Yesterdays" (Guns N' Roses song), a 1992 song from the album Use Your Illusion II
"Yesterday", by Ace Troubleshooter from the album Ace Troubleshooter
"Yesterday", by Atmosphere from When Life Gives You Lemons, You Paint That Shit Gold
"Yesterday", by Bad Religion from Back to the Known
"Yesterday", by Grave Digger from Heavy Metal Breakdown
"Yesterday", by Imagine Dragons from Evolve
"Yesterday", by Karmin
"Yesterday", by Lasgo from Far Away
"Yesterday", by Leona Lewis from Spirit
"Yesterday", by Mary Mary from the album Mary Mary
"Yesterday", by Debelah Morgan from It's Not Over
"Yesterday", by Staind from 14 Shades of Grey
"Yesterday", by Geraint Watkins
"Yesterdays", by Michelle Chamuel
"Yesterdays", by Pennywise from From the Ashes
"Yesterdays", by Switchfoot from Oh! Gravity.

Other
Yesterday (horse), an Irish Thoroughbred racehorse and broodmare

Yesterday (video game), a 2012 adventure game developed by Pendulo Studios
Yesterday (Nog pas gisteren), a 1951 novel by Maria Dermoût

See also
Yesterday and Today (disambiguation)